Hans Blomqvist (born 17 March 1975) is a retired Swedish football forward.

Breaking through for Västra Frölunda IF, he was awarded the Swedish football Newcomer of the Year for 1998.

References

1975 births
Living people
Footballers from Gothenburg
Swedish footballers
Västra Frölunda IF players
IFK Göteborg players
GAIS players
Association football forwards
Allsvenskan players
Superettan players